Rawya Bekhit (born ) is an Emirati female volleyball player. She was part of the United Arab Emirates women's national volleyball team. She participated at the 2011 Pan Arab Games, winning the bronze medal.

References

1986 births
Living people
Emirati women's volleyball players
Place of birth missing (living people)